WBGS may refer to:

 Watford Grammar School for Boys, Watford, UK
 WBGS-LD, a low-power television station (channel 34) licensed to serve Bowling Green, Kentucky, United States
 WBGS, former callsign for radio station WTHQ (AM), serving Point Pleasant, West Virginia, United States
 WBGS, former callsign for radio station WSLA, serving Slidell, Louisiana, United States
 Sibu Airport, Sarawak in Malaysia, by ICAO code